Beach Cops is an Australian factual television series produced by and screened on the Seven Network. The series is filmed on the Northern Beaches of Sydney and follows the New South Wales Police Force operating in the local area while performing their duties.

The program is narrated by Layne Beachley. Northern Beaches local area commander Superintendent Dave Darcy had veto power over content in the series. This series follows on from other observational documentary series featuring police on the Seven Network such as The Force: Behind The Line and Highway Patrol.

Broadcast
The six episode first season premiered in Australia on the Seven Network on 11 October 2015. A second season debuted on 19 October 2016. A third season began on 9 August 2018.

Episodes

Season 1 (2015)

Season 2 (2016)

Season 3 (2018)

Notes
This episode did not air in Western Australia due to staggered network schedule in that state, and aired at a later date.
This episode was originally scheduled to air on 15 November 2015, however was pulled from the schedule for special news coverage of the November 2015 Paris attacks.
This episode did not air in Victoria or South Australia due to staggered network schedule in those states, and aired at a later date.
This episode did not air in South Australia due to staggered network schedule in that state, and aired at a later date.

See also

Gold Coast Cops
Territory Cops
Kalgoorlie Cops

References

External links
 
 Catch Up on PLUS7, Yahoo!7

Australian factual television series
English-language television shows
Seven Network original programming
2015 Australian television series debuts
2010s Australian reality television series
Television shows set in Sydney
Documentary television series about policing
Television series by Seven Productions
Television series by Beyond Television Productions